Phosphatidylinositol-5-phosphate 4-kinase type-2 alpha is an enzyme that in humans is encoded by the PIP4K2A gene.

Function 

Phosphatidylinositol-4,5-bisphosphate, the precursor to second messengers of the phosphoinositide signal transduction pathways, is thought to be involved in the regulation of secretion, cell proliferation, differentiation, and motility. The protein encoded by this gene is one of a family of enzymes capable of catalyzing the phosphorylation of phosphatidylinositol-4-phosphate on the fifth hydroxyl of the myo-inositol ring to form phosphatidylinositol-4,5-bisphosphate. 

The amino acid sequence of this enzyme does not show homology to other kinases, but the recombinant protein does exhibit kinase activity. This gene is a member of the phosphatidylinositol-4-phosphate 5-kinase family.

Clinical significance
Through genome wide association studies (GWAS), some of the single nucleotide polymorphisms (SNPs) located in this gene have been noticed to be significantly associated with susceptibility of childhood acute lymphoblastic leukaemia in ethnically diverse populations.

References

Further reading

External links